This is a list of hospitals in the Czech Republic.

See also

Healthcare in the Czech Republic

References

Czech Republic
Hospitals

Czech Republic